The 1975 NCAA Division I Men's Lacrosse Championship was the fifth annual Division I NCAA Men's Lacrosse Championship tournament. Eight NCAA Division I college men's lacrosse teams met in the postseason single-elimination tournament to decide the national championship.

Tournament overview
The championship game was hosted by Johns Hopkins University and was played in front of 10,875 fans.

The title game saw the Terrapins of the University of Maryland defeat the Midshipmen of the United States Naval Academy by the score of 20–13 for their second national title in three years. Frank Urso scored five goals in the finals for Maryland. The Terps took 62 shots in both the semi-finals and the finals. In the championship game, Maryland and Navy combined for 120 shots.

The national title game represented the 50th time the Middies and Maryland had met since the sport was put on Maryland's varsity list in 1924. The Terps’ season concluded with a five-game winning streak including victories over Johns Hopkins, Hofstra, Washington & Lee and Navy. Navy had earlier in the season upset Maryland.

Bob DeSimone tied for the lead in goals for Navy with eight, scoring 4 goals in the finals. DeSimone would later transfer to Johns Hopkins helping lead the Blue Jays to the 1978 national title and the 1977 finals.

This was the first of four straight impressive tournament appearances by the Cornell attack of Mike French, Jon Levine, Bill Marino and Eamon McEneaney which resulted in titles for the Big Red in 1976 and 1977, as well as a tournament finals appearance in 1978. Cornell was 15 and 1 heading into the tournament and earned the top seed in this tournament. Cornell had defeated Navy handily earlier in the season, 16-7, but were upset by the 4th seeded Navy team in the tournament.

Jack Emmer's Washington and Lee team avenged a loss in the prior year's tournament with an upset of the top-ranked but second seeded Johns Hopkins in the quarterfinals.

Tournament results

Tournament boxscores
Tournament Finals

Tournament Semi-Finals

Tournament Quarterfinals

Tournament outstanding players

Bert Caswell, Maryland, 14 points, leading tournament scorers
Frank Urso, Maryland, 14 points
Jeff Long, Navy, 14 points

 The NCAA did not designate a Most Outstanding Player until the 1977 national tournament. The Tournament outstanding players are listed here as the tournament leading scorers.

References

External links
 Sports Illustrated: Topsy-turvy Title For The Terps, Despite bad starts, Maryland and Navy ended up in the NCAA finals, June 09, 1975

NCAA Division I Men's Lacrosse Championship
NCAA Division I Men's Lacrosse Championship
NCAA Division I Men's Lacrosse Championship
NCAA Division I Men's Lacrosse Championship
NCAA Division I Men's Lacrosse Championship
Lacrosse in Maryland